The 2019 Maryland Terrapins men's soccer team represented the University of Maryland, College Park during the 2019 NCAA Division I men's soccer season. It was the 74th season of the university fielding a program. The Terrapins were led by 27th year head coach, Sasho Cirovski.

Background 

The Maryland Terrapins entered the 2019 season as the defending national champions, winning their first national title since 2008, their fourth NCAA National title, and their fifth claimed national title. During the regular season, the Terrapins posted a relatively poor record of 7–6–3 overall, and 4–4 in Big Ten play. In the 2018 Big Ten Conference Men's Soccer Tournament, the Terrapins defeated Michigan State in the quarterfinals before losing to Indiana in the semis. Despite this, the Terrapins had a strong Top 20 RPI and earned an at-large berth into the 2018 NCAA Division I Men's Soccer Tournament as an 11 seed, allowing them to earn a second round bye. During their tournament won, they did not concede a single goal, and won all their matches in regulation time. Maryland midfielder, Amar Sejdič and Dayne St. Clair earned the NCAA Division I Men's Soccer Tournament Most Outstanding Player award for offense and defense, respectively.

Player movement

Departures

Players arriving

Transfers

Squad information

Roster 
As of August 7, 2019

Coaching staff 

{|class="wikitable"
|-
! style="background:#E03A3E; color:#fff; border:2px solid #FFD520;" scope="col" colspan="2"|Front office
|-

|-
! style="background:#E03A3E; color:#fff; border:2px solid #FFD520;" scope="col" colspan="2"|Coaching staff
|-

Preseason

Preseason Big Ten poll
Maryland was predicted to finish second in the Big Ten Conference.

Schedule 

|-
!colspan=8 style=""| Spring season
|-

|-
!colspan=8 style=""| Preseason
|-

|-
!colspan=8 style=""| Regular season
|-

|-
!colspan=6 style=""| Big Ten Tournament
|-

|-
!colspan=6 style=""| NCAA Tournament
|-

Rankings

Statistics

Appearances and goals

Discipline

Summary

Awards

2020 MLS SuperDraft 

No Maryland players were selected in the 2020 MLS SuperDraft.

References

External links 
 2019 Maryland Men's Soccer Schedule

2019
Maryland Terrapins
Maryland Terrapins
Maryland Terrapins men's soccer
Maryland Terrapins